Beşdəli or Beshdali may refer to:
Beşdəli, Agdash, Azerbaijan
Beşdəli, Sabirabad, Azerbaijan
Beşdəli, Zangilan, Azerbaijan
Beştalı, Neftchala, Azerbaijan
Beştalı, Salyan, Azerbaijan